David Ulibarri is an American politician who served as a member of the New Mexico Senate from 2006 to 2012. A Democrat, he represented the 30th district.

External links
Project Vote Smart - Senator David Ulibarri (NM) profile

References 

Democratic Party New Mexico state senators
Living people
People from Grants, New Mexico
Year of birth missing (living people)
People from Cibola County, New Mexico